The 1987 Southeast Asian Games, officially known as the 14th Southeast Asian Games, was a multi-sport event held in Jakarta, Indonesia from 9 to 20 September 1987 with 30 sports featured in the games.

This was Indonesia's second time to host the SEA Games, the first being in 1979. The games was opened and closed by President Suharto at the Gelora Senayan Stadium. The final medal tally was led by host Indonesia, followed by Thailand and the Philippines.

The games

Participating nations

 
 
 
  (Host)

Sports

Medal table
A total of 1142 medals, comprising 373 Gold medals, 371 Silver medals and 398 Bronze medals were awarded to athletes. The host Indonesia's performance was their best ever yet and emerged as overall champion of the games.
Key

Broadcasting 
In Indonesia, TVRI is known to be the broadcaster of the games, especially at football final.

References

External links

 History of the SEA Games
 OCA Medal Tally

 
1987
Multi-sport events in Indonesia
Southeast Asian Games
Southeast Asian Games
International sports competitions hosted by Indonesia
1980s in Jakarta